Revivre (lit. "Cremation" or “Cosmetics”) is a 2014 South Korean drama film directed by Im Kwon-taek and starring Ahn Sung-ki. It premiered in the Out of Competition section of the 71st Venice International Film Festival in 2014, and was released in South Korean theaters on April 9, 2015.

The film is based on Kim Hoon's short story "Cremation" (also translated as "From Powder to Powder"), which won the Yi Sang Literary Award in 2004.

Plot
Mr. Oh is in his mid-fifties and is a successful marketing executive (sangmoo or managing director) at a major cosmetics company. He struggles to juggle corporate life and preparing for a new ad campaign, while tirelessly caring for his ailing wife, whose health has steadily and painfully deteriorated in the last four years due to brain cancer. During this difficult time, Oh also becomes aware of his growing feelings for Choo Eun-joo, the much younger, alluring new addition to his marketing team. When his wife finally succumbs to her disease, Oh becomes conflicted over his profound grief and newfound passion.

Cast

Ahn Sung-ki as Mr. Oh
Kim Gyu-ri as Choo Eun-joo
Kim Ho-jung as Oh's wife
Jeon Hye-jin as Oh Mi-young, his daughter
Yeon Woo-jin as Kim Min-soo, Mi-young's husband
Shin Young-jin as Oh's sister-in-law 
Kim Gi-cheon as Buddhist devotee Lee 
Kim Byeong-choon as Department head Jo 
Kim Young-hoon as Section chief Jung
Kim Hyun-ah as Section chief Park 
Park Jeong-sik as Deputy Kim 
Seo Young-joo as So-young 
Yoo Yeon as Marketing team secretary 
Min Kyeong-jin as Dr. Choi, urology specialist
Cha Chung-hwa as Dr. Choi, urology nurse
Joo Hyun as Chairman (cameo)
Ahn Suk-hwan as Director Ahn (cameo)
Ye Ji-won as Dance master (cameo)
Bae Han-seong as Executive director Song (cameo)

Awards and nominations

References

External links

2014 drama films
Films based on South Korean novels
Films directed by Im Kwon-taek
South Korean drama films
2014 films
Myung Films films
2010s South Korean films
2010s Korean-language films